Rinspeed Inc. is a Swiss concept car builder and mobility visionary. Since 1991, they have also designed exotic concepts and special vehicles for the CES in Las Vegas, the Geneva Motor Show and other car shows each year, but do not enter into production.

Rinspeed Inc. was founded in 1979 by Frank M. Rinderknecht (born 1955) and works with many Tier 1 and Tier 2 suppliers as Harman, Osram, ZF, SAP, Borbet, Dekra, Harting and many more.

Their latest concept car presented at the CES Las Vegas 2020 - the "MetroSnap" - is a close to serial production modular vehicle.

Concept cars

zaZen

Rinspeed zaZen is a Rinspeed concept car shown for the first time at the 2006 Geneva Motor Show. It is based on the Porsche 911 (997) Carrera S platform and developed in collaboration with Bayer MaterialScience.

The car is able to accelerate from 0 to 60 mph in 4.8 seconds and reach a top speed of 182 mph (293 km/h).

sQuba

Built around a Lotus Elise, the Rinspeed sQuba is a concept car that can 'fly' underwater and has zero emissions. It debuted at the 2008 Geneva Motor Show, 30 years after its inspiration: the movie The Spy Who Loved Me. The sQuba was featured in the first episode of 14th season of UK motoring show Fifth Gear.

Splash
 
Propelled by a 750 cc two cylinder turbo-charged engine burning natural gas which supplies  at 7000 rpm and weighs just , this strange-looking vehicle can accelerate from 0 to 100 km/h in 5.9 seconds. It premiered at the 2004 Geneva Motor Show. The Splash was featured in an episode of Top Gear. In 2006 it set a record for crossing the English Channel in a hydrofoil car, making the journey in 3 hours 14 minutes.

iChange
 
The iChange is a concept car that changes shape and configuration based on the number of passengers inside, up to three. It was unveiled at the 2009 Geneva Motor Show. The car features are controlled by an Apple iPhone and it is powered by a  electric motor.

UC
The Rinspeed UC is a micro concept electric car that was presented at the 2010 Geneva Motor Show. The name UC stands for "Urban Commuter" or "You see". It is a 2.5 metres long micro vehicle, operated with a central joystick. The electric motor delivers  of torque.

Budii
 
The Budii concept displayed at the 2015 Geneva Motor Show is worked around the future possibilities of self driven cars. Budii displays experiments to include vehicle-to-vehicle (V2V) and vehicle-to-infrastructure (V2X) radio-based communications, radar and motion sensing systems including advanced camera monitoring. It is also equipped with telescoping laser scanner on the roof called TrackView which can be raised by 70 centimeters and delivers a precise 3D perspective by combining data from all the various sensors to map the surrounding terrain.

Ʃtos

Concept Ʃtos is a concept presented in the Consumer Electronics Show in 2016. It is based on the BMW i8.

Oasis

Announced late in 2016 and first shown at the Consumer Electronics Show in Las Vegas in January 2017, the Rinspeed Oasis concept car takes Rinspeed's 2015 Budii and 2016 Etos concept cars farther, integrating state-of-the art autonomous vehicle technologies, social media, and Mobility as a Service into a compact car described as a "living room" on wheels. It also features floor to ceiling glass doors, a battery-electric engine, retractable steering wheel, solar panels integrated into the roof, and an augmented reality display. An unusual feature, for a car, is the dash-mounted garden with sensors to advise the user when to feed the plants. It was also shown at the Detroit Motor Show. Partners on the project included Kostal (electronics), Harman (electronic controls), WayRay (infotainment system) among a wide range of other firms.

Modified / tuned cars
In 1993, Rinspeed modified a Dodge Viper with electronically controlled nitrous injection and various other modifications to create the Rinspeed Veleno
In 2005, Rinspeed modified a Subaru Forester to make it appear more feminine - Forester Lady 2006
In 2007, Rinspeed offered a modified 997 911 Turbo that has been transformed into a Le Mans 600.

References

External links
Rinspeed Official site
Rinspeed Editorial Video; West Coast Midnight Run, Vol. 2009, The International Frankfurt Automotive Show

Auto parts suppliers of Switzerland
Swiss brands
Automotive motorsports and performance companies
Rinspeed vehicles